Lockyer is a north-western suburb of Albany in southern Western Australia. Its local government area is the City of Albany.  The suburb has a median age of 33, and was officially named in 1954.

Geography 
Lockyer is bounded to the North by the South Coast Highway, to the east by Hanrahan Road, to the south by Cuming Road and to the west by Cull Road.

Facilities 
The suburb has a local primary school within its boundaries, Mount Lockyer Primary School. Local students would attend North Albany Senior High School in Milpara for secondary education.

References

Suburbs of Albany, Western Australia